The Yellow Rose of Texas may refer to:

 "The Yellow Rose of Texas" (song), a traditional folk song
 The Yellow Rose of Texas (film), a 1944 American film directed by Joseph Kane
 The Yellow Rose of Texas (legend) inspired by the activities of Emily D. West in the Texas Revolution
 The Yellow Rose of Texas (flower) a hybrid rose cultivar
 Yellow Rose of Texas (box set), a box set by Ernest Tubb
 Yellow Rose of Texas Award
 Amarillo, Texas
 David Von Erich (1958–1984), American professional wrestler